Vathy is a town on the Greek Ionian island of Meganisi, which is part of the Lefkada regional unit. The Bay of Vathy in one of the world's largest natural harbors. 

Populated places in Lefkada (regional unit)